Sami swoi (translated as All Friends Here or Our Folks; literally "only our own") (1967) is the first part of a Polish comedic trilogy of movies by Sylwester Chęciński. Its two follow-ups are Nie ma mocnych (a Polish idiom meaning "no one can do") (1974) and Kochaj albo rzuć ("Love or Leave") (1977).

The film 
The film was black and white but was colorized in 2000 by Dynacs Digital Studios for Polish television station Polsat. The score was composed by Wojciech Kilar.

The movie was filmed mostly in Dobrzykowice near Wrocław, with some scenes at Lubomierz and surrounding areas.

It was one of the most popular Polish comedies of its times and still remains an old favorite. Lubomierz has a museum dedicated to the movies, and Toruń has a statue of the two main heroes, Kargul and Pawlak.

The story 

The movie is the story of the two quarreling families, who after the end of the Second World War were resettled from Kresy to the Regained Territories, after Poland's borders were shifted westwards. The bad blood between them runs to a time when one of Karguls plowed a few inches ('3-fingers-width') into the Pawlak's territory, for which one of the Pawlaks hit him with a scythe and then, fearing retribution, emigrated to the United States. Years later, he comes back, and finds that both families live peacefully. His brother, Kazimierz, tells him the story of how the families came to terms, in a form of Romeo and Juliet-like marriage between Pawlak's son, Witia, and Kargul's daughter, Jadźka.

The actors 
Pawlak family
Wacław Kowalski - Kazimierz ('Kaźmirz')
Zdzisław Karczewski - Jan 'John'
Jerzy Janeczek - Witia
Maria Zbyszewska - Mania
Natalia Szymańska - Leonia
Zygmunt Bielawski - Paweł ('Pawełek')
Kargul family
Władysław Hańcza - Władysław ('Władyś')
Ilona Kuśmierska - Jadwiga ('Jadźka')
Halina Buyno-Łoza - Aniela ('Anielcia')
Others
Eliasz Oparek-Kuziemski - Kokeszko
Aleksander Fogiel - sołtys (village headman)
Witold Pyrkosz - 'the guy from Warsaw'
Kazimierz Talarczyk - Wieczorek
Ryszard Kotys - cats seller
Andrzej Mrożek - Russian soldier
Jan Łopuszniak - German priest

External links 

1967 films
1967 comedy films
Polish comedy films
1960s Polish-language films
Films scored by Wojciech Kilar